Jurriene Arrasta Diergaardt (born 16 July 2000) is a Namibian cricketer. She made her Women's Twenty20 International (WT20I) debut for the Namibia women's cricket team on 20 August 2018, against Malawi, in the 2018 Botswana Cricket Association Women's T20I Series. It was the first WT20I match to be played by Namibia.

In August 2019, she was named in Namibia's squad for the 2019 ICC Women's World Twenty20 Qualifier tournament in Scotland. She played in Namibia's second match of the tournament, on 1 September 2019, against Thailand. In May 2021, she was named in Namibia's squad for the 2021 Kwibuka Women's T20 Tournament in Rwanda.

References

External links
 

2000 births
Living people
People from Oshana Region
Namibian women cricketers
Namibia women Twenty20 International cricketers